is one of the 18 wards of the city of Yokohama in Kanagawa Prefecture, Japan. In 2010, the ward had an estimated population of 146,563 and a population density of 7,080 persons per km². The total area was 20.86 km².

Geography
Naka Ward is located in eastern Kanagawa Prefecture, and east of the geographic center of the city of Yokohama. Its name means "middle ward." In the low-lying Northern district, commonly referred to as Kannai, it hosts the Yokohama city hall and the headquarters of the Kanagawa prefectural government.  The central part of the ward includes elevated ground; this area, known as Yamate, has long been a residential area. Along the shore lies reclaimed land upon which port facilities, part of the Minato Mirai 21 complex, and Yamashita Park were built. To the south are the piers, oil refineries and the central port of Yokohama. The Nakamura River, a branch of the Ōoka River, cuts across the northern part of the ward. The northernmost and southernmost points are upland.

Surrounding wards
Nishi Ward
Minami Ward
Isogo Ward

History

In the Edo period, the area of present-day Naka Ward was part of the tenryō territory in Musashi Province controlled directly by the Tokugawa shogunate, but administered through various hatamoto. In the Bakumatsu Period, the signing of the Kanagawa Treaty provided for the opening of treaty ports, and the area of what is now central Naka Ward was designated as open to foreign settlement in 1859. The Yokohama Cricket Club (now known as the Yokohama Country & Athletic Club) was established in 1868. Yokohama Chinatown was also established during this period.

After the Meiji Restoration, the area was transferred to the new Kuraki District in Kanagawa Prefecture. Yokohama's wards were established on October 10, 1927, with this area becoming Naka Ward. The 1923 Great Kantō earthquake devastated downtown Yokohama. Yamashita Park was established in 1930 with landfill from the earthquake rubble. In December 1943,  Minami Ward was separated from Naka Ward, which also gave up some territory to Kanagawa Ward and Hodogaya Ward. Nishi Ward was separated from Naka Ward in 1944. During World War II, the Yokohama Air Raid of May 29, 1945 left 14,157 people dead, injured, or missing. After the surrender of Japan, some 74% of the land, 90% of port area in Naka Ward was occupied by the American military. The last of this territory was not returned to Japan until March 31, 1982.

Economy
Naka Ward is a regional commercial center and the old main business district of Yokohama.

Yokohama's day labourers concentrate in the Kotobuki-cho ward near the Ishikawachō Station. Historically, most used to work at the harbour, with 5500 labourers in 1982.

Transportation

Rail
East Japan Railway Company – Keihin-Tohoku Line, Negishi Line, Yokohama Line
  -  -  - 
Keihin Electric Express Railway - Keikyū Main Line
 
Yokohama Minatomirai Railway Company – Minatomirai Line
  - Nihon-ōdōri - Motomachi-Chūkagai
Yokohama City Transportation Bureau – Blue Line
  – –
Japan Freight Railway Company-Tōkaidō Freight Line

Highways
Shuto Expressway
National Route 16
National Route 133
National Route 357

Ferry
The Port Service

Education

Colleges and universities:
 Ferris University
Kanto Gakuin University

The Kanagawa Prefectural Board of Education operates prefectural high schools:
 
 

The  operates municipal high schools:
 
 

The municipal board of education operates public elementary and junior high schools.

Junior high schools:

 Honmoku (本牧)
 Minato (港)
 Nakaodai (仲尾台)
 Otori (大鳥)
 Yokohama Yoshida (横浜吉田)

Elementary schools:

 Honcho (本町)
 Honmoku (本牧)
 Honmoku Minami (本牧南)
 Kitagata (北方)
 Makado (間門)
 Motomachi (元街)
 Otori (大鳥)
 Tateno (立野)
 Yamamoto (山元)

Additionally, the zones of Azuma Elementary School (東小学校), Ishikawa Elementary School (石川小学校), Minami Yoshida Elementary School (南吉田小学校), Minatomiraihoncho Elementary School (みなとみらい本町小学校), and Negishi Elementary School (根岸小学校), all with campuses outside of Naka-ku, include portions of Naka-ku.

Private primary and secondary schools:
Yokohama International School
Yokohama Overseas Chinese School
Yokohama Yamate Chinese School
Yokohama Jogakuin Junior and Senior High School

Local attractions

Hikawa Maru
Isezakichō
Japan Coast Guard Museum Yokohama
Kannai
Motomachi
NYK Maritime Museum
Ōsanbashi Pier
Sankeien
Yamashita Park
Yamate
Yokohama Archives of History
Yokohama Bay Bridge
Yokohama Chinatown
Yokohama Curry Museum (closed 2007)
Yokohama Foreign General Cemetery
Yokohama Marine Tower
Yokohama Red Brick Warehouse
Yokohama Stadium

Events
Yokohama Honmoku Jazz Festival, annually in late summer

Notable people

Anna Ogino, author

References
 Kato, Yuzo. Yokohama Past and Present. Yokohama City University (1990).

External links

 
 Official website (Archive)
 

 
Wards of Yokohama